Jan Čapek of Sány (c. 1390, Sány – c. 1452, probably in Hukvaldy) was a Czech Hussite noble, general of Władysław III of Poland.

Biography
Čapek was first mentioned in Hungarian sources as a leader of Władysław’s Hungarian-Polish army, which around 15 June 1440 occupied Győr, a territory belonged to Elizabeth of Luxemburg and her son, Ladislaus the Posthumous. He might be the leader of the army when Władysław crossed the borders of Hungary for the crowning ceremony, as he was the elected king of Hungary at this time.

He took part at the war against Ottomans in 1443, but he was not mentioned as a participant of the Battle of Varna, where the king died. He returned to Moravia, where he owned the castle of Hukvaldy. He probably died in 1452. A record from 1453 states that Jan Čapek's widow sold the Hukvaldy estate to her son-in-law Jan Talafús.

Sources
 Papajík: Jan Čapek: David Papajík: Jan Čapek ze Sán cseh nemes és szerepe a magyar koronáért folytatott harcban (1440–1443). Aetas, XXVIII. évf. 2013. 1.  128–136. pp

Czech generals
Hussite people
15th-century soldiers
People from Nymburk District
Czech military leaders
People of the Hussite Wars